The list of ship commissionings in 1944 includes a chronological list of ships commissioned in 1944.  In cases where no official commissioning ceremony was held, the date of service entry may be used instead.


References 

1944
 Ship commissionings
 Ship launches
Ship launches